In 1890–91, Everton competed in the Football League's third season, and were crowned champions for the first time by two points over two-time defending champions Preston North End. They also competed in the FA Cup but lost in the first round to Sunderland.

Regular Football League First team

Other members of the title winning squad

Having finished the previous season as runners up Everton made just one signing of note during the summer when William Campbell was brought from Bootle to fill the centre half role, which had remained unsettled since George Farmer had been dropped the previous November. Robert Smalley's position in goal was also under threat from an emerging twenty-year-old Scot named Jack Angus while David Kirkwood having lost the battle to secure the inside right birth to Alec Brady, now shared the centre back duties with Charlie Parry

This settled look ensured that there were just two new faces in the opening day 4–1 victory at West Bromwich Albion, Campbell, who scored and Angus who kept goal in the side listed above as the most settled team used that season.  The team remained unchanged through the first four games of the campaign, which were all won, before Latta missed the fifth game. Everton still won to take their winning start to five games before being held to a 2–2 draw at Aston Villa. Everton remained unbeaten for their first seven games but their first choice eleven did not play again as a run of three straight defeats saw the return of Robert Smalley for one game in place of Jack Angus before David Jardine was signed in November from Bootle.

Everton completed all bar one of their fixtures before the end of January and had to wait while the nearest challengers for the title, Preston played a series of games to close the gap at the top to two points. Everton's final game of the season was at Burnley on Saturday 14 March 1891 when almost half the 10,000 attendance was made up of visiting Everton fans. The team of Jardine, McLean, Doyle, Lochhead, Holt, Parry, Latta, Brady, Geary, Chadwick and Milward required only a draw but failed, losing 3–2. Preston would themselves have claimed a third consecutive title has they won their fixture at Sunderland but Evertonians, returning to Liverpool by train from Burnley were met with a delighted crowd at the station who informed them that Preston had lost 0–3 and that Everton had won the title for the first time.

There was no official honour for individual players for being crowned champions so the Everton directors had a medal minted for every player The Football League took up the idea the following year and medals have been presented to every championship winning side since.

The Football League

Football Association Challenge Cup

Final league table

Achievements
Despite being crowned champions the 1890/91 team actually picked up fewer points than the side who missed out on the title the previous season. Their title triumph came despite a record losing and winless away run in the middle of the season. The 1891 title side also equalled or set the following club records.
English Football League Champions for the first time
Equalled most home points = 18 with 1889–90 team
Equalled most wins = 14 with 1889–90 team
Most home wins in a season = 9
Fewest goals conceded in a season = 29
Fewest goals conceded at home in a season = 12
Fewest goals conceded away from home in a season = 17
Record away League victory = 6–2 at Derby County, 13 December 1890
Most goals in a single game = 4 by Thomas Wylie at Derby County, 13 December 1890
Equalled most team hat-tricks in a season = 2 with 1889–90 team
Hat-tricks = 2 Fred Geary & Thomas Wylie
Record Everton career League hat-tricks = 2  by Fred Geary 1890 & 1891
Fewest players used in a season = 20
Longest home winning sequence = 6 games
Longest unbeaten sequence = 7 games
Equalled Longest home unbeaten run = 6 games with 1889–90 team
Longest sequence of away draws = 1 (with all previous Everton League teams)
Fewest drawn games in a season = 1
None of Everton's eleven home games were drawn, matching the 1888–89 team
Equalled fewest away draws in a season = 1 with the 1889–90 team
Equalled longest home losing sequence = 1 (with all previous Everton League teams)
Longest losing sequence away from home = 3
Equalled longest winless away run = 4 with the 1888–89 team

Sources

 http://www.evertonfc.com/stats/?mode=season&era_id=1&season_id=4&seasons=4 
 http://www.allfootballers.com

1890-91
English football clubs 1890–91 season
1891